Arthur Hubert Stanley "Peter" Megaw,  (20 July 191028 June 2006) was an architectural historian and archaeologist. He specialised in Byzantine churches. He served as Director of the Department of Antiquities, Cyprus between 1935 and 1960 and as Director of the British School at Athens from 1962 to 1968.

Early life
Megaw was born on 20 July 1910 at Portobello House nursing home in Portobello, Dublin, Ireland. He was the second of four sons of Arthur Stanley Megaw, a solicitor, and his wife, Helen Isabel Bertha Megaw (née Smith). Between 1924 and 1928, he was educated at Campbell College, Belfast, a boys boarding school. He went on to read architecture at Peterhouse, University of Cambridge. He graduated in 1931 with a Bachelor of Arts (BA) degree which was later promoted to Master of Arts (MA (Cantab)) degree. Two of his brothers, Basil Megaw and Eric Megaw, also had notable careers in their own fields.

Academic career
Megaw never held an academic post at a university. He spent 75 years 'working on the study and preservation of the monuments of the Christian East'.

He first joined the British School at Athens as Walston Student in 1931, to study Byzantine architecture. He served as the first Director of the Department of Antiquities, Cyprus between 1935 and 1960. With the independence of Cyprus form British Rule in 1960, he spent two short, successive posts at Dumbarton Oaks, Washington DC, United States of America and at the Byzantine Institute of America in Istanbul, Turkey. He served as Director of the British School at Athens from 1962 to 1968. Following his early retirement from the directorship, he joined the Harvard Centre for Byzantine Studies at Dumbarton Oaks as a visiting scholar. He spent the remaining years of the 1960s and the 1970s splitting his time between Cyprus and the United States.

Megaw's work can be seen in the photographic collection held at the Conway Library, Courtauld Institute of Art.

Later life
Megaw died of cancer on 28 June 2006 at his London home in Hampstead. He was cremated on 20 July 2006 at Golders Green Crematorium, Golders Green, London.

Personal life
Megaw was known to his friends and colleagues as Peter.

In Cyprus he also acted as a Public Information Officer and an Intelligence Officer on behalf of the Colonial Government.

In 1937, he married Elektra Elena Mangoletsi. She was an artist who was born in 1905. She died in 1993, therefore predeceasing him. They did not have any children.

Honours
In June 1949, he was appointed Serving Brother of the Venerable Order of Saint John (SBStJ). In the 1951 King's Birthday Honours, he was appointed Commander of the Order of the British Empire (CBE). He was promoted to Commander of the Venerable Order of Saint John (CStJ) in September 1967.

In 1995, the Society of Antiquaries of London awarded him the Frend medal. This is an award for studies related to the archaeology, history and topography of the early Christian Church. The book Mosaic: festschrift for A.H.S. Megaw was published in 2001 in his honour.

Publications 

 Megaw, A. H. (1946). Three vaulted basilicas in Cyprus. The Journal of Hellenic Studies, 66, 48–56.
 Megaw, A. H. (1972). Supplementary excavations on a castle site at Paphos, Cyprus, 1970-1971. Dumbarton Oaks Papers, 323–343.
 Megaw, A. H. S. (1974). Byzantine architecture and decoration in Cyprus: metropolitan or provincial?. Dumbarton Oaks Papers, 28, 57–88.
 Megaw, A. H. (1976). Excavations at the episcopal basilica of Kourion in Cyprus in 1974 and 1975: A preliminary report. Dumbarton Oaks Papers, 30, 345–371.
 Megaw, A. H. S., & Jones, R. E. (1983). Byzantine and allied pottery: A contribution by chemical analysis to problems of origin and distribution. Annual of the British School at Athens, 78, 235–263.
 Megaw, A. H. S. et al. (2007). Kourion. Excavations in the Episcopal Precinct. Dumbarton Oaks Research Library and Collection. Harvard.

References

1910 births
2006 deaths
Archaeologists from Dublin (city)
Irish Byzantinists
Irish architectural historians
Commanders of the Order of the British Empire
Commanders of the Order of St John
People educated at Campbell College
Alumni of Peterhouse, Cambridge
Directors of the British School at Athens
British Byzantinists
20th-century archaeologists
Byzantine archaeologists